Doxa Polemidion is a Cypriot association football club based in Kato Polemidia, located in the Limassol District. Its colours are yellow and black. It has five participations in Cypriot Fourth Division.

References

Football clubs in Cyprus
Association football clubs established in 1958
1958 establishments in Cyprus